The 2010 Hiroshima Toyo Carp season features the Hiroshima-based professional baseball team quest to win their first Central League title since 1991. Kenjiro Nomura, one of its legend, was introduced as their new manager at the end of last season, who pledge to bring the league title to Hiroshima this season.

This article lists its official game at 2010 season.

Pre-season

Standings

Game log

|-  style="text-align:center; background:#fbb;"
| 1 || 26 Feb || @ Hawks || 1–6 || Houlton (1–0) || Shinoda (0–1) ||  || 22,713 || 0–1–0
|-  style="text-align:center; background:#fbb;"
| 2 || 27 Feb || @ Hawks || 1–2 || Mahara (1–0) || Kishimoto (0–1) ||  || 22,490 || 0–2–0
|-  style="text-align:center; background:#bfb;"
| 3 || 2 Mar || @ Dragons || 3–0 || Alvarado (1–0) || Kongoh (0–1) || Ueno (1) || 9,054 || 1–2–0
|-  style="text-align:center; background:#bfb;"
| 4 || 4 Mar || Lions || 7–5 || Umetsu (1–0) || Y. Tanaka (0–1) || Kishimoto (1) || 8,261 || 2–2–0
|-  style="text-align:center; background:#bfb;"
| 5 || 6 Mar || Marines || 3–1 || Alvarado (2–0) || Naruse (0–2) || T. Aoki (1) || 11,224 || 3–2–0
|-  style="text-align:center; background:#bfb;"
| 6 || 7 Mar || Marines || 9x-8 || Kishimoto (1–1) || Uchi (0–1) || || 6,190 || 4–2–0
|-  style="text-align:center; background:#fbb;"
| 7 || 10 Mar || @ Eagles || 4–5 (8) || Arime (1–0) || K. Nagakawa (0–1) ||  || 2,076 || 4–3–0
|-  style="text-align:center; background:#bfb;"
| 8 || 12 Mar || @ Tigers || 7–1 || T. Aoki (1–0) || Kojima (0–1) || || 3,802 || 5–3–0
|-  style="text-align:center; background:#bfb;"
| 9 || 13 Mar || Hawks || 9–5 || T. Aizawa (1–0) || Sugiuchi (0–1) || || 5,349 || 6–3–0
|-  style="text-align:center; background:#fbb;"
| 10 || 14 Mar || SoftBank || 6–7 || Otonari (1–1) || K. Maeda (0–1) || Kume (2) || 18,025 || 6–4–0
|-  style="text-align:center; background:#fbb;"
| 11 || 16 Mar || @ Marines || 2–7 || H. Ueno (1–0) || Kishimoto (1–2) ||  || 7,389 || 6–5–0
|-  style="text-align:center; background:#fbb;"
| 12 || 17 Mar || @ Giants || 1–6 || Fujii (2–0) || Komatsu (0–1) ||  || 28,650 || 6–6–0
|-  style="text-align:center; background:#bfb;"
| 13 || 18 Mar || @ Swallows || 4–0 || T. Aoki (2–0) || Tateyama (0–1) || || 4,338 || 7–6–0
|-  style="text-align:center; background:#bfb;"
| 14 || 20 Mar || @ Tigers || 7–0 || K. Maeda (1–1) || Ando (0–2) || Alvarado (1) || 7,394 || 8–6–0
|-  style="text-align:center; background:#fbb;"
| 15 || 21 Mar || Tigers || 6–10 || Nomi (2–1) || Shinoda (0–2) ||  || 23,534 || 8–7–0
|-

Regular season

Standings

 as 11 June 2010.source : http://bis.npb.or.jp/eng/2010/standings/

Game log

|-  style="text-align:center; background:#bfb;"
| 1 || 26 Mar || @ Dragons || 3–1 || K. Maeda (1–0) || Yoshimi (0–1) || K. Nagakawa (1) || 35,980 || 1–0–0
|-  style="text-align:center; background:#fbb;"
| 2 || 27 Mar || @ Dragons || 0–7 || Chen (1–0) || Alvarado (0–1) || || 33,441 || 1–1–0
|-  style="text-align:center; background:#fbb;"
| 3 || 28 Mar || @ Dragons || 7-8x || A. Takahashi (1–0) || K. Nagakawa (0–1) || || 32,824 || 1–2–0
|-  style="text-align:center; background:#fbb;"
| 4 || 30 Mar || Tigers || 3–6 || Nomi (1–0) || T. Aoki (0–1) || Fujikawa (1) || 28,074 || 1–3–0
|-  style="text-align:center; background:#fbb;"
| 5 || 31 Mar || Tigers || 4–6 || Kubo (1–0) || Saitoh (0–1) || Fujikawa (2) || 16,049 || 1–4–0
|-

|-  style="text-align:center; background:#bbb;"
| 6 || 1 Apr || Tigers || colspan=6|Game postponed due to rain
|-  style="text-align:center; background:#fbb;"
| 7 || 2 Apr || Giants || 4–5 || Gonzalez (1–1) || K. Maeda (1–1) || Kroon (3) || 17,779 || 1–5–0
|-  style="text-align:center; background:#fbb;"
| 8 || 3 Apr || Giants || 5–6 || Kaneto (1–0) || Schultz (0–1) || Kobayashi (1) || 28,455 || 1–6–0
|-  style="text-align:center; background:#fbb;"
| 9 || 4 Apr || Giants || 3–10 || Tohno (1–1) || Komatsu (0–1) ||  || 29,186 || 1–7–0
|-  style="text-align:center; background:#bfb;"
| 10 || 6 Apr || @ Swallows || 3–2 || K. Nagakawa (1–1) || Oshimoto (0–1) || Schultz (1) || 12,549 || 2–7–0
|-  style="text-align:center; background:#fbb;"
| 11 || 7 Apr || @ Swallows || 1–7 || Tateyama (2–0) || Saitoh (0–2) ||  || 9,057 || 2–8–0
|-  style="text-align:center; background:#bfb;"
| 12 || 8 Apr || @ Swallows || 4–0 || K. Maeda (2–1) || Ishikawa (0–3) || Schultz (2) || 12,133 || 3–8–0
|-  style="text-align:center; background:#fbb;"
| 13 || 9 Apr || @ BayStars || 0–5 || Miura (1–0) || Alvarado (0–2) ||  || 11,372 || 3–9–0
|-  style="text-align:center; background:#bfb;"
| 14 || 10 Apr || @ BayStars || 7–3 || Komatsu (1–1) || Kaga (0–3) || || 19,104 || 4–9–0
|-  style="text-align:center; background:#fbb;"
| 15 || 11 Apr || @ BayStars || 3–6 || Shimizu (1–1) || Hasegawa (0–1) ||  || 17,801 || 4–10–0
|-  style="text-align:center; background:#bfb;"
| 16 || 13 Apr || Swallows || 3x-2 (10) || K. Takahashi (1–0) || Takagi (0–1) || || 12,776 || 5–10–0
|-  style="text-align:center; background:#bfb;"
| 17 || 14 Apr || Swallows || 6–3 || Saitoh (1–2) || Ishikawa (0–4) || Schultz (3) || 12,425 || 6–10–0
|-  style="text-align:center; background:#fbb;"
| 18 || 15 Apr || Swallows || 1–2 || Oshimoto (1–1) || Shinoda (0–1) || Lim (4) || 12,563 || 6–11–0
|-  style="text-align:center; background:#bfb;"
| 19 || 16 Apr || Dragons || 4x-3 || K. Takahashi (2–0) || Asao (0–1) || || 13,500 || 7–11–0
|-  style="text-align:center; background:#bfb;"
| 20 || 17 Apr || Dragons || 8x-7 || K. Takahashi (3–0) || A. Takahashi (3–1) ||  || 23,681 || 8–11–0
|-  style="text-align:center; background:#bfb;"
| 21 || 18 Apr || Dragons || 4–2 || Yokoyama (1–0) || Nagamine (0–1) || Schultz (4) || 25,244 || 9–11–0
|-  style="text-align:center; background:#fbb;"
| 22 || 20 Apr || @ Tigers || 0–5 || Shimoyanagi (2–1) || Saitoh (1–3) ||  || 38,116 || 9–12–0
|-  style="text-align:center; background:#bfb;"
| 23 || 21 Apr || @ Tigers || 2–1 || Maeda (3–1) || Kubo (2–2) || Schultz (5) || 38,242 || 10–12–0
|-  style="text-align:center; background:#bbb;"
| 24 || 22 Apr || @ Tigers || colspan=6|Game postponed due to rain
|-  style="text-align:center; background:#fbb;"
| 25 || 23 Apr || @ Giants || 4–10 || Tohno (4–1) || Stults (0–1) || || 43,847 || 10–13–0
|-  style="text-align:center; background:#fbb;"
| 26 || 24 Apr || @ Giants || 4–7 || Ochi (2–0) || Takahashi (3–1) || || 46,673 || 10–14–0
|-  style="text-align:center; background:#fbb;"
| 27 || 25 Apr || @ Giants || 2–8 || Obispo (1–0) || Komatsu (1–2) ||  || 43,091 || 10–15–0
|-  style="text-align:center; background:#bfb;"
| 28 || 27 Apr || BayStars || 3–0 || Maeda (4–1) || Randolph (0–4) || Schultz (6) || 12,210 || 11–16–0
|-  style="text-align:center; background:#fbb;"
| 29 || 28 Apr || BayStars || 1–2 || Terahara (3–2) || Saitoh (1–4) || Yamaguchi (7) || 15,541 || 11–17–0
|-  style="text-align:center; background:#fbb;"
| 30 || 29 Apr || BayStars || 0–8 || Shimizu (3–2) || Stults (0–2) ||  || 28,030 || 11–18–0
|-  style="text-align:center; background:#bfb;"
| 31 || 30 Apr || Dragons || 9–0 || T. Aoki (1–1) || Ogasawara (1–3) || || 18,437 || 12–18–0
|-

|-  style="text-align:center; background:#fbb;"
| 32 || May. 1 || Dragons || 6–12 || Suzuki (1–0) || Komatsu (1–3) || || 30,707 || 12–19–0
|-  style="text-align:center; background:#bfb;"
| 33 || May. 2 || Dragons || 4x-3 || Takahashi (4–1) || Asao (1–2) || || 31,821 || 13–19–0
|-  style="text-align:center; background:#bfb;"
| 34 || May. 3 || @ BayStars || 3–1 || Maeda (5–1) || Randolph (0–5) || Schultz (7) || 24,132 || 14–19–0
|-  style="text-align:center; background:#fbb;"
| 35 || May. 4 || @ BayStars || 5-6x || Yamaguchi (1–3) || Takahashi (4–2) || || 27,074 || 14–20–0
|-  style="text-align:center; background:#fbb;"
| 36 || May. 5 || @ BayStars || 4–5 || Shimizu (4–2) || Stults (0–3) || Yamaguchi (10) || 22,620 || 14–21–0
|-  style="text-align:center; background:#fbb;"
| 37 || May. 7 || @ Tigers || 6–10 || Kubota (3–1) || Takahashi (4–3) ||  || 38,157 || 14–22–0
|-  style="text-align:center; background:#bfb;"
| 38 || May. 8 || @ Tigers || 11–8 || Shinoda (1–1) || Kawasaki (0–1) ||  || 46,768 || 15–22–0
|-  style="text-align:center; background:#fbb;"
| 39 || May. 9 || @ Tigers || 3–4 || Nishimura (4–0) || Maeda (5–2) || Fujikawa (9) || 46,703 || 15–23–0
|-  style="text-align:center; background:#fbb;"
| 40 || May. 13 || Eagles || 4–6 || Nagai (3–3) || Aoki (1–2) || Kawagishi (7) || 13,047 || 15–24–0
|-  style="text-align:center; background:#fbb;"
| 41 || May. 14 || Eagles || 7–8 || Inoue (1–0) || Bale (0–1) || Yamamura (1) || 25,671 || 15–25–0
|-  style="text-align:center; background:#bfb;"
| 42 || May. 15 || Fighters || 1x-0 || Maeda (6–2) || Tanimoto (1–2) || || 31,842 || 16–25–0
|-  style="text-align:center; background:#fbb;"
| 43 || May. 16 || Fighters || 2–6 || M. Takeda (2–4) || Imai (0–1) || || 30,281 || 16–26–0
|-  style="text-align:center; background:#fbb;"
| 44 || May. 18 || @ Buffaloes || 2–11 || Kondo (2–4) || T. Aoki (1–3) || || 16,368 || 16–27–0
|-  style="text-align:center; background:#bfb;"
| 45 || May. 19 || @ Buffaloes || 8–2 || Stults (1–3) || Komatsu (2–2) || || 16,784 || 17–27–0
|-  style="text-align:center; background:#bfb;"
| 46 || May. 21 || @ Hawks || 7–1 || Maeda (7–2) || Otonari (1–6) || || 33,277 || 18–27–0
|-  style="text-align:center; background:#fbb;"
| 47 || May. 22 || @ Hawks || 4–7 || Wada (6–3) || Aizawa (0–1) || Mahara (14) || 31,952 || 18–28–0
|-  style="text-align:center; background:#bbb;"
| 48 || May. 23 || Lions || colspan=6|Game postponed due to rain
|-  style="text-align:center; background:#bfb;"
| 49 || May. 24 || Lions || 3–0 || Stults (2–3) || Kishi (7–2) || Yokoyama (1) || 20,235 || 19–28–0
|-  style="text-align:center; background:#fbb;"
| 48 || May. 25 || Lions || 7–10 || Hsu (3–4) || Kishimoto (0–1) || Sikorski (16) || 10,699 || 19–29–0
|-  style="text-align:center; background:#fbb;"
| 50 || May. 26 || Chiba || 1–9 || Murphy (3–0) || Takahashi (4–4) || || 17,089 || 19–30–0
|-  style="text-align:center; background:#bfb;"
| 51 || May. 27 || Chiba || 3–0 || Maeda (8–2) || Naruse (6–5) || Yokoyama (2) || 19,576 || 20–30–0
|-  style="text-align:center; background:#fbb;"
| 52 || May. 29 || @ Eagles || 2-3x (10) || Koyama (2–1) || K. Nagakawa (1–2) || || 17,529 || 20–31–0
|-  style="text-align:center; background:#fbb;"
| 53 || May. 30 || @ Eagles || 2–4 || Tanaka (7–3) || T. Aoki (1–4) || || 20,248 || 20–32–0
|-

|-  style="text-align:center; background:#bfb;"
| 54 || June. 1 || @ Fighters || 5–4 || Kishimoto (1–1) || Miyanishi (1–1) || Yokoyama (3) || 19,478 || 21–32–0
|-  style="text-align:center; background:#ffb;"
| 55 || June. 2 || @ Fighters || 2–2 (12) ||  ||  ||  || 21,421 || 21–32–1
|-  style="text-align:center; background:#bfb;"
| 56 || June. 4 || Hawks || 5–4 || Stults (3–3) || Takahashi (2–1) || Yokoyama (4) || 26,250 || 22–32–1
|-  style="text-align:center; background:#fbb;"
| 57 || June. 5 || Hawks || 3–9 || Wada (8–3) || T. Aoki (1–5) ||  || 31,786 || 22–33–1
|-  style="text-align:center; background:#fbb;"
| 58 || June. 6 || Orix || 1–6 || Kisanuki (5–5) || Soriano (0–1) ||  || 25,489 || 22–34–1
|-  style="text-align:center; background:#fbb;"
| 59 || June. 7 || Orix || 10–21 || Leicester (1–2) || Alvarado (0–3) ||  || 9,324 || 22–35–1
|-  style="text-align:center; background:#ffb;"
| 60 || June. 9 || @ Marines || 2–2 (12) ||  ||  ||  || 18,573 || 22–35–2
|-  style="text-align:center; background:#bfb;"
| 61 || June. 10 || @ Marines || 12–7 (12) || Oshima (1–0) || Kawagoe (2–2) ||  || 23,139 || 23–35–2
|-  style="text-align:center; background:#bfb;"
| 62 || June. 12 || @ Lions || 6–2 || Otake (1–0) || Hoashi (6–5) ||  || 31,618 || 24–35–2
|-  style="text-align:center; background:#bfb;"
| 63 || June. 13 || @ Lions || 4–2 || Alvarado (1–3) || Kishi (8–4) || Bale (1) || 31,647 || 25–35–2
|-  style="text-align:center; background:#bbb;"
| 64 || June. 18 || Swallows || colspan=6|Game postponed due to rain
|-  style="text-align:center; background:#bfb;"
| 65 || June. 19 || Swallows || 5–1 || Maeda (9–2) || Ishikawa (2–8) ||  || 26,161 || 26–35–2
|-  style="text-align:center; background:#fbb;"
| 66 || June. 20 || Swallows || 2–4 || Yoshinori (3–5) || Takahashi (4–5) || Lim (11) || 23,175 || 26–36–2
|-  style="text-align:center; background:#fbb;"
| 67 || June. 22 || Tigers || 7–13 (11) || K. Fujikawa (3–1) || Umetsu (0–1) ||  || 14,327 || 26–37–2
|-  style="text-align:center; background:#fbb;"
| 68 || June. 23 || Tigers || 4–9 || Standridge (3–1) || Stults (3–4) ||  || 13,028 || 26–38–2
|-

Players In/Out

In

Draft
 Takeru Imamura
 Shota Dobayashi
 Hisashi Takeuchi
 Hayato Shoji
 Kota Ito
 Taketo Kawaguchi

Others
 Ken Takahashi (free agent, from New York Mets)
 Giancarlo Alvarado (from Albuquerque Isotopes)
 Jeff Fiorentino (from Baltimore Orioles)
 Justin Huber (from Minnesota Twins)
 John Bale (from Kansas City Royals)
 Eric Stults (from Los Angeles Dodgers)
 Yuichiro Mukae (traded from Orix Buffaloes)

Out
 Colby Lewis (free agent, to Texas Rangers)
 Koichi Ogata (retired, now Hiroshima Toyo Carp Baserunning Batting Trainer Staff)
 Rui Makino (sacked, now Yokohama Baystars Batting Pitcher)
 Yoshinori Ogata (sacked, now Hiroshima Toyo Carp Scouting Staff)
 Toshimitsu Higa (sacked)
 Masayuki Hasegawa (traded to Orix Buffaloes)
 Go Kida (traded to Orix Buffaloes)

Roster

Long-term injury list

References

External links
 Hiroshima Toyo Carp Season Results

Hiroshima Toyo Carp seasons
2010 Nippon Professional Baseball season